Luka Pavlin (born 16 October 1988) is a retired Slovenian football midfielder. His uncle is a well-known former Slovenian footballer Miran Pavlin.

References

External links
NZS profile 

1988 births
Living people
Sportspeople from Kranj
Slovenian footballers
Association football midfielders
NK Olimpija Ljubljana (2005) players
FC Koper players
Olympiakos Nicosia players
Slovenian Second League players
Slovenian PrvaLiga players
Slovenian expatriate footballers
Expatriate footballers in Cyprus
Slovenian expatriate sportspeople in Cyprus